Top Country Albums is a chart that ranks the top-performing country music albums in the United States, published by Billboard.  In 2008, 21 different albums topped the chart; placings were based on electronic point of sale data from retail outlets.

In the issue of Billboard dated January 5, the Eagles were at number one with Long Road Out of Eden, the album's sixth week in the top spot.  Two weeks later, it was displaced by the self-titled album by Taylor Swift, which returned to number one having spent eight weeks atop the chart in 2007.  The album spent a further 16 weeks at number one in 2008, in five separate spells atop the chart.  Its final week at number one came in the issue of Billboard dated July 26, and the following week Swift replaced herself in the top spot when Beautiful Eyes entered the chart at number one.  The new release, a limited-run EP available only at Walmart stores or online, held the top spot for a single week.  Swift returned to number one in November with her second full-length album Fearless, which spent the final five weeks of the year atop the chart and made her the only act with three number ones during the year.

Two acts reached number one with two different albums in 2008.  Tim McGraw unusually topped the chart with two different greatest hits albums: in May he spent a single week at number one with Greatest Hits: Limited Edition, a combined re-release of his first two such albums, which had each reached number one in their own right in 2000 and 2006.  In October he returned to the top of the chart with the newly released Greatest Hits 3.  Toby Keith spent time at number one with both 35 Biggest Hits and That Don't Make Me a Bad Guy.  Several acts reached number one in 2008 for the first time, beginning with the group Lady Antebellum with its self-titled album in May.  On June 7, Julianne Hough, best known as one of the professional dancers from the TV show Dancing with the Stars, spent a week at number one with her debut album.  Two weeks later singer Jewel reached the top spot with her first release to enter the country chart; her albums had appeared on the all-genre Billboard 200 chart for more than a decade, but Perfectly Clear was her first recording in the country genre.  The duo Sugarland spent six non-consecutive weeks at number one in August and September with its first chart-topper Love on the Inside, and in September and October Jessica Simpson and Darius Rucker both topped the chart for the first time.  Rucker was the first African-American artist to become a major star in the country genre since Charley Pride in the late 1960s.

Chart history

References

2008
United States Country Albums
2008 in American music